Red River Valley University was a private liberal arts college located in Wahpeton, North Dakota, and affiliated with the Methodist Church.  The university opened in 1893, and operated independently until 1905, when limited funds forced the closure of the Wahpeton campus. The university's trustees then forged an affiliation agreement with the University of North Dakota (UND), and reopened the school on the UND campus as "Wesley College."

The former Red River Valley University building in Wahpeton still survives, and is known as Old Main on the campus of the North Dakota State College of Science.  It was added to the National Register of Historic Places in 1984.

The Old Main building is a three-story red brick building which is H-shaped in plan.  It has a five-story square bell tower over the main entry.

Notable people
 Janette Hill Knox (1845-1920), faculty and Vice-President, English Language, French and German

References

Sources
 

Defunct private universities and colleges in North Dakota
University and college buildings on the National Register of Historic Places in North Dakota
Educational institutions established in 1893
1893 establishments in North Dakota
1905 disestablishments in North Dakota
National Register of Historic Places in Richland County, North Dakota
Educational institutions disestablished in 1905
Methodist universities and colleges
Methodism in North Dakota
Education in Richland County, North Dakota
Wahpeton, North Dakota